Adama City Football Club (oromo: Garee Kubbaa Miilaa Magaalaa Adaamaa; Amharic: አዳማ ከትማ እግር ኳስ ክለብ) is an Ethiopian professional football club based in Adama. The club competes in Ethiopian Premier League, the top division in Ethiopian football.

History 
The club was founded in 1991 (1983 E.C.).

Adama City briefly held the top spot late in the 2017–18 Ethiopian Premier League season before eventually finishing 5th.

On August 4, 2018 the club hired Sisay Abraham as manager and Dawit Tadesse as assistant coach. In February 2021, the club hired Zeray Mulu as its manager.

Stadium 
The club's home ground is Abebe Bikila stadium (Adama), the second such stadium in the country to be named after Olympic marathon champion Abebe Bikila.

Support 
Adama City (Ketema) enjoys a great support for its fans both at home in Adama and during away fixtures. The supporters have been involved in some altercation with some rival team supporters in the past.

Finances 
As of 2018, Salaries at the club have steadily risen with player like Jecko Peaze Peryze earning 165,000 Br per month. United Beverages, makers of the Ethiopian beer brand Anbessa Beer, is a sponsor of the club and in 2021 provided the club with new Jako branded Kits.

Sponsors 
On March 25, 2022 Adama City football Club signed a sponsorship agreement with United Beverage for 60 milion birr for 5 years.

Departments

Active Departments 

 Women's Football Team
 Football Team (U17)
 Football Team (U20)

Players

First-team squad
As of 7 March 2021

Club Officials 
CEO:  Anbessa Megersa

Coaching staff 

 Manager/Head Coach:  Aschalew Hailemichael    
 First Assistant coach: Degu Dubamo
Goalkeeper coach: Ephrem Eshetu 
Team Leader: Girma Tadesse 
Physiotherapist:  Yohannes Getachew

Former Coaches 
  Wubetu Abate
 Ashenafi Bekele 
 Negene Negash
  Sisay Abraham
 Aschalew Hailemichael (-2021)

Former Players 

  Tesfaye Bekele
  Mujib Kassim
  Biruk Kalbore

References

External links
 Official website

Football clubs in Ethiopia
Association football clubs established in 1993
1993 establishments in Ethiopia
Sport in Oromia Region